Ang Tshering Sherpa (2 October 1964 - 27 February 2019) was a Nepali entrepreneur and founder of Yeti Airlines.

Career
Sherpa started his career in the 1990s at a local trekking agency managed by one of his brothers.
In 1993, Sherpa founded Air Dynasty before founding Yeti Airlines in 1998.

Sherpa also served as served as chairman of the board for Himalaya Airlines from 2014 until his death in 2019.

Death
Ang Tshering Sherpa, along with six other people, died in a helicopter crash while returning from Pathibhara Devi Temple, Taplejung, Nepal, on 27 February 2019. According to the Himalayan Times, hundreds of people viewed his last rites in Kathmandu.

As Tshering was a golfer, and an annual golf tournament organized by Yeti Airlines after his death was named in his memory.

References

1964 births
2019 deaths
Airline founders
Nepalese businesspeople
Victims of aviation accidents or incidents in Nepal
Victims of helicopter accidents or incidents
21st-century Nepalese businesspeople
20th-century Nepalese businesspeople